Jeannette Rosita Young  (born 1963) is an Australian medical doctor and administrator who is the current governor of the state of Queensland. Before being sworn in as governor, Young was the Chief Health Officer of Queensland from 2005 to 2021.

Career
Young was born in 1963 in Sydney, New South Wales. She attended secondary school at St Ives High School, graduating in 1980, before studying at the University of Sydney and graduating in 1986 with a Bachelor of Medicine and Bachelor of Surgery. She started her career as a doctor at Westmead Hospital in Sydney in 1986 before moving into medical administration at the same hospital in July 1992.

She relocated to Queensland upon her appointment as Director of Medical Services at Rockhampton Hospital in December 1994. In April 1995, she attained a Master of Business Administration by Macquarie University. She then moved into a position similar to her role in Rockhampton, as Executive Director of Medical Services at Princess Alexandra Hospital in Brisbane, in January 1999.

On 17 August 2005, she was appointed to succeed Gerry FitzGerald as Chief Health Officer of Queensland. She gained prominence during the COVID-19 pandemic in 2020, holding multiple press briefings regarding the disease. Her recommendation to the Palaszczuk Government to close the state's borders, which was implemented, proved controversial as she received numerous death threats and was placed under police protection in September 2020.

On 21 June 2021, the Premier Annastacia Palaszczuk announced Young would become the 27th Governor of Queensland. The incumbent Governor Paul de Jersey was due to retire in July 2021, but extended his term until November to allow Young to focus on the COVID-19 vaccine rollout as chief health officer.

Titles, styles, and honours

Degrees 

 1986: Bachelor of Medicine and Bachelor of Surgery from the University of Sydney

Fellowships 
 2004: Fellow of the Royal Australasian College of Medical Administrators

Honorary degrees 
 2015: Honorary doctorate from Griffith University
 2017: Honorary doctorate from Queensland University of Technology

Honorary appointments 
 1 November 2021, as of her swearing in as governor
  Australian Army, Regimental Colonel of the Royal Queensland Regiment.
  Order of St John, Deputy Prior of the Order of St John.
  Scouts Australia, Chief Scout of Scouts Australia QLD
  Honorary, Air Commodore of No. 23 Squadron RAAF

References

External link

Living people
1963 births
Medical doctors from Sydney
Australian women medical doctors
Australian medical doctors
Companions of the Order of Australia
20th-century Australian medical doctors
20th-century Australian public servants
21st-century Australian medical doctors
21st-century Australian public servants
Australian health officials
University of Sydney alumni
Recipients of the Public Service Medal (Australia)
Governors of Queensland
20th-century Australian women
21st-century Australian women